The men's 4 × 400 metres relay event at the 2023 European Athletics Indoor Championships will be held on 5 March 2023 at 19:10 (final) local time.

Records

Medalists

Results
Spain led most of the way to only finished fourth, and their young and extremely talented 18-year-old anchor, the 400m world indoor junior champion, was just overtaken at the very end, specifically on the very last bend, by older and more experienced final leg runners.

References

2023 European Athletics Indoor Championships
4 × 400 metres relay at the European Athletics Indoor Championships